Druggett or drugget is "a coarse woollen fabric felted or woven, self-coloured or printed one side". Jonathan Swift refers to being "in druggets drest, of thirteen pence a yard".

Formerly, a drugget was a sort of cheap stuff, very thin and narrow, usually made of wool, or half wool and half silk or linen; it may have been corded but was usually plain. The term is now applied to a coarse fabric having a cotton warp and a wool filling, used for rugs, tablecloths, etc.

See also 

 Ratteen

Notes

References

External links

Woollen industry
Printed fabrics
Woven fabrics
Waulked textiles